Several individuals have been described as the father of medicare in Canada. Medicare is the country's publicly funded health system.

Tommy Douglas championed  public health insurance as Premier of Saskatchewan from 1944 to 1961 and federal leader of the New Democratic Party from 1961 to 1971.
Woodrow Lloyd was the Premier of Saskatchewan when universal medicare was introduced in Saskatchewan.
Lester B. Pearson was the Liberal Prime Minister of Canada from 1963 to 1968. His government saw medicare introduced on a national basis, after his party wrote and introduced the legislation for hospital and out-of-hospital treatment, and received the support of Douglas' NDP.
Emmett Matthew Hall was a jurist and chair of the 1964 Royal Commission on health care in Canada which recommended the nationwide adoption of Saskatchewan's system of public insurance for both hospitalization and out-of-hospital medical services. In 1996, Prime Minister Jean Chrétien stated that "Canadians will be forever grateful for the pivotal role that [Hall] played in bringing universal medicare to Canada. Throughout his long life, he remained medicare's most eloquent defender".
Paul Martin Sr., Minister of National Health and Welfare from 1946 to 1957, played a central early role in the adoption of hospital insurance and is also remembered as a father of Medicare.

This list includes individuals from three major distinct and competing Canadian political traditions: Douglas and Lloyd from the Co-operative Commonwealth Federation, later the New Democratic Party; Hall, a Progressive Conservative; and Martin and Pearson, Liberals.

References

Healthcare in Canada
Canadian political phrases